Katariya may refer to:

Places 
 Katariya, Ambedkar Nagar district, a census town in Uttar Pradesh, India
 Katariya, Ghazipur district, a village in Uttar Pradesh, India
 Katariya, Kutch, a village in Kutch district, Gujarat, India

People 

Ashok Katariya (born 1972), Indian politician from Uttar Pradesh 
Lavmeet Katariya, Indian volleyball player
Sharat Katariya (born 1978), Indian film director and screenwriter
Vandana Katariya (born 1992), Indian field hockey player

See also 

 Kataria (disambiguation)